Polemon (or Polemo) is the name of eminent ancient Greeks:

Philosophers
Polemon (scholarch), the head of the Platonic Academy from 314–269 BC
Polemon of Athens, a 2nd-century BC Stoic philosopher, also referred to as Polemon of Ilium
Polemon of Laodicea, a 2nd-century sophist

Macedonian officers
Polemon (son of Andromenes), 
Polemon (son of Megacles), 
Polemon (son of Theramenes),

Kings and other monarchs
Polemon I of Pontus, king of Pontus from 36 BC to AD 8
Polemon II of Pontus, son to the above, king of Pontus from 38 to 64

Other
Polemon (snake), a genus of venomous snakes found in Africa
Polemopolis, a Latin name of Sodankylä
Pokémon